Stanisław Trembecki (8 May 1739 – 12 December 1812) was a Polish Enlightenment poet, well known for his poems Na dzień siódmy września and Nadgrobek hajduka that are said to have started a new trend in Polish political lyric poetry.

External links

Stanisław Trembecki in Virtual Library of Polish Literature 

1739 births
1812 deaths
Polish male writers